Lindholmiola is a genus of air-breathing land snails, terrestrial pulmonate gastropod mollusks in the family Helicodontidae.

Species
Species within the genus Lindholmiola include:

 Lindholmiola barbata
 Lindholmiola corcyrensis
 Lindholmiola girva
 Lindholmiola gyria
 Lindholmiola lens
 Lindholmiola pirinensis
 Lindholmiola regisborisi
 Lindholmiola reischuetzi
 Lindholmiola spectabilis

References

 
Helicodontidae